Flying Officer Nirmal Jit Singh Sekhon, PVC (17 July 1945 – 14 December 1971) was an officer of the Indian Air Force. He was posthumously awarded the Param Vir Chakra, India's highest military decoration during war time, in recognition of his lone defence of Srinagar Air Base against a Pakistan Air Force (PAF) air raid during the Indo-Pakistani War of 1971. He is the only member of the Indian Air Force to be honoured with the PVC.

Flying Officer Sekhon's remains as well as the exact location of the crash site of his aircraft are still unknown.

Early life
Nirmal Jit Singh Sekhon was born in a Sikh Jat family on 17 July 1943 in the village of Isewal, Ludhiana, Punjab Province, British India. His father was M.W.O. Tarlok Singh Sekhon and his mother was Harbans Kaur. He was commissioned into the Indian Air Force on 4 June 1967 as a Pilot Officer.

Param Vir Chakra Award
During the Indo-Pakistani War of 1971, he was serving with the No.18 Squadron, "The Flying Bullets" of IAF, flying the Folland Gnat fighter aircraft based at Srinagar. On 14 Decembers 1971, Srinagar airfield was attacked by six Pakistan Air Force F-86 jets of 26 Squadron from PAF Base Peshawar. Flying Officer Sekhon was on readiness duty at that time. As soon as the first aircraft attacked, Sekhon rolled for take-off as No 2 in a two-Gnat formation, with Flt. Lt. Ghumman in lead, just as the first bombs were falling on the runway. Only delayed due to dust kicked up by the preceding Gnat, Sekhon lost no time in singling out the first Sabre pair, which was re-forming after the bombing run. The Gnat Leader, Flt. Lt. Ghumman lost visual with his wingman just after take-off, remained out of the fight leaving Sekhon to handle the muddle all by himself. In the ensuing air battle, Sekhon scored a direct hit on one Sabre and set another ablaze. The latter was seen heading away towards Rajauri, trailing smoke. However Pakistani records deny any aircraft losses to Sekhon. A native of Rurka Issewal village in Dakha, had sacrificed his life during the Indo-Pak War of 1971.

Sekhon, after being hit, was advised to return to the base by ATC Squadron Leader  Virendera Singh Pathania VrC, VM. He is said to have flown in straight, wings level for some time, then going inverted, plummeting down, probably due failure of control system. He attempted a last-minute ejection, which did not prove successful, as his canopy was seen to fly off. The wreckage of the Gnat was found in a gorge, near the road coming from Srinagar town to the base, a few miles from the base. Despite many search efforts by Army and Air Force, his remains were never found due to the mountainous terrain of where his fighter went down, much to the disappointment of his wife and family.

A detailed story of his effort has been mentioned in fairly detailed account by Air Cdre Kaiser Tufail. His skill was later also praised in an article by Salim Baig Mirza, the pilot who shot him down.
The bravery, flying skill and determination displayed by Flying Officer Sekhon, against odds of 1:6, earned him India's highest wartime medal for gallantry, the Param Vir Chakra.

Citation 
The Param Vir Chakra citation reads as follows:

Honours
Nirmal Jit Singh Sekhon is remembered for his gallantry and statues of him have also been erected in many cities in Punjab.

A marine tanker built in 1985 was named Flying Officer Nirmal Jit Singh Sekhon, PVC.

Legacy and depictions in popular culture

A statue in tribute of Nirmal Jit Singh Sekhon was erected at the district court of Ludhiana (first erected at Samrala Chowk, Ludhiana) in the courtyard next to the flag pole. A decommissioned Folland Gnat fighter is part of the memorial and serves as a gate guardian.

His statue along with a decommissioned Folland Gnat fighter has been placed in the Indian Air Force Museum, Palam.

Air Marshal BR Krishna unveiled Sekhon's bust in 2021 at Govt. Senior Sec. School, Issewal in Ludhiana, his birthplace.

References

External links

 Flying Officer Nirmal Jit Singh Sekhon's citation of the Param Vir Chakra at Bharat-Rakshak.com.
 File Photo of Marine Tanker Flying Officer Nirmal Jit Singh Shekhon, PVC
 A tribute on Bharat-Rakshak
 A tribute to Nirmal Jit
 At Sikh History
 Profile of Sekhon on Tribune India
Jai Hind Jai Bharat
 
 YouTube Video by Headlines today which, at 13:31, shows animated account of Nirmal Jit Singh Sekhon's PVC Action.

1943 births
1971 deaths
Indian military personnel killed in action
Sikh warriors
Punjabi people
Indian Air Force officers
Indian aviators
Pilots of the Indo-Pakistani War of 1971
Recipients of the Param Vir Chakra
Indian military personnel of the Indo-Pakistani War of 1971
Military personnel from Ludhiana
Aviators killed by being shot down